The Apostolic Prefecture of Placentia was a short-lived (1870–91) Catholic pre-diocesan jurisdiction in Atlantic Canada.

It was named after its see, Placentia, an alamagated town on the Avalon Peninsula, Newfoundland and Labrador.

History 
 Established on 16 September 1870 as Apostolic Prefecture of Placentia / Placentia (Latin), on territories split off from the then Archdiocese of St. John's (which it was held in personal union with) and Diocese of Harbour Grace.
 Suppressed in 1891, its territory being reassigned to the above St. John's, Newfoundland, which it in effect merged (back) into.

Ordinary 
Its only episcopal leader was :
 Thomas James  (born Ireland) (1870.05.09 – see suppressed 1891), also Bishop of St. John's, Newfoundland (1870.05.08 – death 1893.12.04).

References

Sources and external links 
 GCatholic - data for all sections

Apostolic vicariates
Former Roman Catholic dioceses in America